was a village located in Higashimatsuura District, Saga Prefecture, Japan.

As of 2003, the village has an estimated population of 2,627 and a population density of 41.77 persons per km2. The total area is 62.89 km2.

On January 1, 2006, Nanayama was merged into the expanded city of Karatsu.

Dissolved municipalities of Saga Prefecture